Udaykumar Chaganlal Joshi (born 23 December 1944, in Rajkot) is an Indian former cricketer active from 1965 to 1983 who played for Sussex.

He appeared in 186 first-class matches as a right-handed batsman who bowled off breaks. He scored 2,287 runs with a highest score of 100 not out and took 557 wickets with a best performance of six for 33.
He also played for South Shields CC in 1977 and probably minor county cricket for Durham CCC.

In 2012, Joshi was convicted of having sexually molested a 13-year-old boy in Northern Ireland in 1979 and was jailed for six years. He was also barred from working with children in the future. At the time of his conviction, Joshi was a 67-year-old married father of two.

References

1944 births
Living people
Indian cricketers
Sussex cricketers
Saurashtra cricketers
Railways cricketers
Gujarat cricketers
Indian Universities cricketers
Indian Starlets cricketers
West Zone cricketers
Indian people imprisoned abroad
Gujarati people